Michelle Anne Mahowald (January 12, 1963 – December 26, 1996) was an American computational neuroscientist in the emerging field of neuromorphic engineering. In 1996 she was inducted into the Women in Technology International Hall of Fame for her development of the Silicon Eye and other computational systems. She committed suicide at age 33.

Early life and education

Mahowald, known as Misha, was born in Minneapolis, Minnesota, daughter of Alfred and Joan Fischer Mahowald. She had a younger sister, Sheila.

After graduating high school, she attended the California Institute of Technology, graduating with a degree in biology in 1985.  She continued at Caltech as a PhD student in Computation and Neural Systems under the supervision of Professor Carver Mead, a specialist in VLSI.  For her thesis, Mahowald created her own project by combining the fields of biology, computer science, and electrical engineering, to produce the silicon retina.

Career

The silicon retina used analog electrical circuits to mimic the biological functions of rod cells, cone cells, and other non-photoreceptive cells in the retina of the eye.  The invention was not only highly original and potentially useful as a device for restoring sight to the blind, but it was also one of the most eclectic feats of electrical and biological engineering of the time.  This remarkable example of engineering earned Mahowald a well-deserved reputation as one of the most famous female engineers of her age. Her work has been considered "the best attempt to date" to develop a stereoscopic vision system.  She was awarded a doctorate in computational neuroscience in 1992, and her invention of the silicon retina and the silicon neuron earned her articles in the prestigious scientific journals Scientific American and Nature, as well as four patents and the Clauser Prize for her dissertation. A revised version of her dissertation  was subsequently published in book form.

Mahowald then re-located to the University of Oxford for one year to do a post-doctoral fellowship with eminent neuroscientists Kevan Martin and Rodney Douglas.  After the completion of this project, Mahowald moved to  Zürich to help found the Institute of Neuroinformatics (Institut für Neuroinformatik) at the University of Zurich and ETH Zurich, a research institution whose mission is to discover the key principles by which brains work and to implement these in artificial systems that interact intelligently with the real world.

In 1996, she was made a member of the Women in Technology International (WITI) Hall of Fame.

Mahowald died in Zürich at the end of 1996, taking her own life at the age of 33.

Aspects of her work and personal life have been described in a book about the creation of the vision sensor company Foveon.

Award

The Misha Mahowald Prize for Neuromorphic Engineering was created to recognize outstanding achievements in the field of neuromorphic engineering and was first awarded in 2016.

Publications

The following is a list of Misha Mahowald's scientific publications from 1989 onwards. Her name continued to appear on publications after her death in recognition of the strong contributions she had made to those works while still alive.

2000
R. Hahnloser, R. Sarpeshkar, M. Mahowald, R.J. Douglas and S. Seung: "Digital selection and analog amplification co-exist in an electronic circuit inspired by neocortex", Nature, 405: 947-951, 2000

1999
R.J. Douglas, C. Koch, M.A. Mahowald and K.A.C. Martin: "Recurrent excitation in neocortical circuits", Cerebral Cortex, Plenum Press, 1999
R.J. Douglas, M.A. Mahowald and A.M. Whatley: "Strutture di Comunicazione Nei Sistemi Analogici Neuromorfi [Communications Infrastructure for Neuromorphic Analog Systems]", Frontiere della Vita, 3: 549-560, D.J. Amit and G. Parisi (Eds.), Enciclopedia Italiana, 1999
R. Hahnloser, R. Douglas, M. Mahowald and K. Hepp: "Feedback interactions between neuronal pointers and maps for attentional processing", Nature Neuroscience, 2: 746–752, 1999
P. Häfliger and M. Mahowald: "Weight vector normalization in an analog VLSI artificial neuron using a backpropagating action potential", Learning in silicon, G. Cauwenbergh (Ed.), Kluwer Academics, 1999
P. Häfliger and M. Mahowald: "Spike based normalizing hebbian learning in an analog VLSI artificial neuron", Analog Integrated Circuits and Signal Processing, 18:(2/3) 133-140, Feb, 1999

1998
P. Häfliger and M. Mahowald: "Weight vector normalization in an analog VLSI artificial neuron using a backpropagating action potential", Neuromorphic Systems, Engineering Silicon from Neurobiology:16, 191-196, L.S. Smith and A.Hamilton (Eds.), World Scientific, 1998
C. Rasche, R. Douglas and M. Mahowald, "Characterization of a Pyramidal Silicon Neuron", Neuromorphic Systems: Engineering Silicon from Neurobiology:14, 169-177, L.S. Smith and A. Hamilton (Eds.), World Scientific, 1998

1996
R. Douglas and M. Mahowald: "Design and fabrication of analog VLSI neurons", Methods in Neuronal Modelling: From Synapses to Networks, C. Koch and I. Segev (Eds.), MIT press, 1996
R.J. Douglas, M.A. Mahowald and K.A.C. Martin: "Microarchitecture of Neocortical Columns", Brain theory - biological basis and computational principles, 75-95, A. Aertsen and V. Braitenberg (Eds.), Elsevier Science, 1996
R.J. Douglas, M.A. Mahowald and K.A.C. Martin: "Neuroinformatics as explanatory neuroscience", Neuroimage, 4: 25-28, 1996
R.J. Douglas, M.A. Mahowald, K.A.C. Martin and K.J. Stratford: "The role of synapses in cortical computation", Journal of Neurocytology, 25: 893-911, 1996
P. Häfliger, M. Mahowald and L. Watts: "A spike based learning neuron in analog VLSI", Advances in neural information processing systems, 9: 692-698, 1996

1995
R. Douglas and M. Mahowald: "A Constructor set for Silicon Neurons", An Introduction to Neural and Electronic Networks:14 277-296, S.F. Zornetzer, J.L. Davis, C. Lau and T. McKenna (Eds.), Academic Press, 1995
R. Douglas and M. Mahowald: "Silicon Neurons", The Handbook of Brain Theory and Neural Networks 282-289, M. Arbib (Ed.), MIT Press, 1995
R. Douglas, M. Mahowald and C. Mead: "Neuromorphic Analog VLSI", Annual Review of Neuroscience, 18: 255-281, 1995
R.J. Douglas, C. Koch, M. Mahowald, K.A.C. Martin and H.H. Suarez: "Recurrent Excitation in Neocortical Circuits", Science, 269: 981-985, 1995

1994
R.J. Douglas, M.A. Mahowald and K.A.C. Martin, "Hybrid analog-digital architectures for neuromorphic systems", Neural Networks, 1994 IEEE World Congress on Computational Intelligence, 3: 1848-1853, IEEE, 1994

1989
M. Mahowald and T. Delbrück: "Cooperative stereo matching using static and dynamic image features", Analog VLSI Implementation of Neural Systems, 213-238, C. Mead and M. Ismail (Eds.), Kluwer Academic Publishers, 1989.

References

American neuroscientists
1963 births
1996 suicides
American women neuroscientists
Women inventors
Alumni of the University of Oxford
California Institute of Technology alumni
Scientists from Minneapolis
20th-century American scientists
20th-century American women scientists
20th-century American inventors